The 2019 Campeonato Pernambucano (officially the Pernambucano da Série A1 de 2019) was the 105th edition of the state championship of Pernambuco organized by FPF. The championship began on 19 January and ended on 21 April.

In the Finals, Sport and the defending champions Náutico tied 2–2 on aggregate. Sport won on penalties to win their 42nd Campeonato Pernambucano title. As champions, Sport qualified for the 2020 Copa do Brasil and 2020 Copa do Nordeste.

Náutico and Afogados qualified for 2020 Copa do Brasil as runners-up and third placed team, respectively.

Santa Cruz (best second-team in the 2019 RNC) qualified for the 2020 Copa do Nordeste. Náutico qualified for the 2020 Pré-Copa do Nordeste via RNC.

Teams

Ten teams were competing, nine returning from the 2018 and Petrolina, promoted as champions of 2018 Pernambucano A2 Championship.

Schedule
The schedule of the competition was as follows.

First stage
In the first stage, each team played the other nine teams in a single round-robin tournament. The teams were ranked according to points (3 points for a win, 1 point for a draw, and 0 points for a loss). If tied on points, the following criteria would be used to determine the ranking: 1. Wins; 2. Goal difference; 3. Goals scored; 4. Head-to-head; 5. Fewest red cards; 6. Fewest yellow cards; 7. Draw in the headquarters of the FPF.

Top eight teams advanced to the quarter-finals of the final stages. The two teams with the lowest number of points were relegated to the 2020 Campeonato Pernambucano A2. Top three teams not already qualified for 2020 Série A, Série B or Série C qualified for 2020 Série D.

Standings

Results

Final stages
Starting from the quarter-finals, the teams played a single-elimination tournament with the following rules:
Quarter-finals, semi-finals and third place match were played on a single-leg basis, with the higher-seeded team hosting the leg.
 If tied, the penalty shoot-out would be used to determine the winner.
Finals were played on a home-and-away two-legged basis, with the higher-seeded team hosting the second leg.
 If tied on aggregate, the penalty shoot-out would be used to determine the winner.
Extra time would be not played and away goals rule would be not used in final stages.

Bracket

Quarter-finals

|}

Matches

Semi-finals

|}

Matches

Sport qualified for the 2020 Copa do Brasil.

Náutico qualified for the 2020 Copa do Brasil.

Third place match

Afogados qualified for the 2020 Copa do Brasil.

Finals

|}

Matches

Sport qualified for the 2020 Copa do Nordeste.

Top goalscorers

2019 Campeonato Pernambucano team
The 2019 Campeonato Pernambucano team was a squad consisting of the eleven most impressive players at the tournament.

||

References

Campeonato Pernambucano seasons
Pernambucano